Maisel Synagogue is one of the historical monuments of the former Prague Jewish quarter. It was built at the end of the 16th century which is considered to be the golden age of the ghetto. Since then its appearance has changed several times, its actual style is neo-gothic. Nowadays the synagogue belongs to the Jewish Community of Prague and is administered by the Jewish Museum in Prague as a part of its expositions.

History

The origin and first appearance of the synagogue 
The construction of the synagogue was initiated by Mordechai Maisel. First, in 1590, this renowned businessman and benefactor of the ghetto gained the building site. One year later he obtained from the emperor Rudolf II, the current sovereign of the country, a privilege to build his own synagogue. Mordecai Maisel had an important position at Rudolf's court and that probably helped him to gain this favour. The architectural plan for Maisel synagogue, designed by Judah Coref de Herz, was realized by Josef Wahl and in 1592, on Simchat Torah, the synagogue was consecrated. For the next century it became the largest and most impressive building in the ghetto, also thanks to its abundant equipment. Maisel bequeathed the synagogue to the Prague Jewish community, yet after his death in 1601 all his possession, including the synagogue, was confiscated (in spite of another imperial privilege, allowing Maisel to write a testament). Maisel's last will was therefore fulfilled entirely only after a number of trials, several decades later.

Later changes 
In 1689 the synagogue was severely damaged by fire that affected the whole ghetto. It was reconstructed in a hurry and lost one third of its length. Then it was changed in the 19th century (in 1862–1864 according to architectural plan of J. W. Wertmüller) and again at the turn of the 20th century when all the Jewish Quarter went through a big urban renewal. Architect Alfred Grotte reconstructed the synagogue in Neo-Gothic style.

Modern history 
During the Nazi occupation of the Czech lands, properties of the Czech Jewish communities were stored in Maisel Synagogue. After the World War II the synagogue became a depository of Jewish Museum in Prague. During the sixties it was restored and between 1965 and 1988 an exposition of silver Judaica was located there. Then the synagogue was closed because of deplorable technical conditions, which could not be improved because of lack of financial means.  Velvet revolution made necessary reconstruction possible and the synagogue was then opened for visitors in 1996, showing an exposition of Jewish history in the Czech lands from the beginning (9th century) till the age of Enlightenment which meant a turning point in Jewish social status. After the recent restoration of Maisel Synagogue, this exposition has been updated (modern and interactive elements added), its topic, however, has remained the same.

Recent reconstruction 
The recent reconstruction took place between April 2014 and June 2015. In opposite to previous unified white colour of outside and inside, the decorative elements were accentuated so the synagogue looks the same as at the beginning of the 20th century. Thanks to the reconstruction the synagogue also provides more comfort to its visitors including barrier-free entrance. It will be opened for cultural events as well (concerts, author reading, one-man theatre etc.).

See also 

 Meisel family

Notes

External links  
 

Synagogues in Prague
Josefov (Prague)
Synagogues preserved as museums
History museums in the Czech Republic
Jewish museums in the Czech Republic
Museums in Prague
Religious buildings and structures completed in 1592
16th-century synagogues
16th-century establishments in Bohemia
1592 establishments in the Habsburg monarchy